Schuchart is a family name of:

 Brigitte Schuchardt (born 28 March 1955, in Jena), German swimmer
 Elliott J. Schuchardt (born September 26, 1966), American civil liberties attorney
 Helga Schuchardt (born 1939), German politician
 Hugo Schuchardt (4 February 1842, Gotha (Thuringia) – 21 April 1927, Graz (Styria), German linguist
 Johann Christian Schuchardt (5 May 1799, Buttstädt - 10 August 1870, Weimar), German jurist, graphic artist, art historian and art critic.
 Tomasz Schuchardt (born 18 September 1986), Polish actor

Surnames